The Twisted Whiskers Show is an animated comedy television series based on the Twisted Whiskers greeting cards created by Terrill Bohlar for American Greetings. It began airing as the first program of the Hasbro/Discovery TV network, Discovery Family (formerly known as  The Hub until October 13, 2014) on October 10, 2010. 26 half-hour episodes of the CG series were produced by American Greetings Properties, DQ Entertainment, MoonScoop LLC, CloudCo, Inc., and Telegael. The series was also aired on Teletoon in Canada, CBBC in the United Kingdom, MTV3 Junior in Finland and Disney Channel in Japan.

Characters
 Dander (voiced by David Kaye) - A cat who was used to "the good life," lives with a woman who works in politics and foreign relations. Anything outside his kitty cat world is approached with a naïveté that gets him into trouble. Usually seen with his pal, Yawp, they are on a continuous saga to get back home after falling off a moving truck.
 Yawp (voiced by Scott McNeil) - Although this feisty little puppy can't talk, he's definitely not short on personality.
 Dine & Dash (voiced by Peter Kelamis and Lee Tockar) - Two streetwise alley cats with matching black and white "prison" stripes, Dine is the fast talking leader and Dash the lovable dope. The two usually go to great lengths to get food from stealing to conning.
 Goosers (voiced by Scott McNeil) - A consummate yellow Labrador Retriever who is loyal and trustworthy. He usually has to deal with protecting his owner Claude (voiced by David Kaye) or something the man holds dear, from some strange occurrence.
 Tiny Head (voiced by Colin Murdock) - A full-grown tabby cat with a kitten-sized head, Tiny Head is an eternal optimist whose talking often makes him oblivious to everything around him.
 Cutie Snoot (voiced by Kathleen Barr) - This little kitten has pink fur, appearing cute yet with an evil streak on her.
 Mister Mewser (voiced by Bill Kopp) - A shut-in house cat with tuxedo markings who lives in a huge Victorian mansion, the fate of its owners never revealed. Seeing himself more as a sophisticated human, Mewser keeps mice as indentured servants and enjoys watching old Westerns.
 Smidgeon - He's Mister Mewser's little mouse butler. He and Mewser like each other more than either would like to admit. 
 Ird the Bird (voiced by Scott McNeil) - A blue jay with a deep voice, Ird makes a cameo in most episodes and serves as an antagonist in some. 
 Von Ripper (voiced by Scott McNeil) - A shark-like guard dog with a silvery gray coat, a spiked collar and a mouth full of nasty sharp teeth. He usually serves as an antagonist most of the time. 
 Sinister Squirrel (voiced by Scott McNeil) - A crazy squirrel identified by a chunk of fur missing from his tail. Known as an enemy to Goosers and a neighbor to Ird.
 Zippy the Greyhound (voiced by Lee Tockar) - This retired racing dog is shell-shocked from too many years on the track. The littlest sound causes him to bolt, usually into something painful.
 Cambridge Kitty (voiced by Colin Murdock) - An alleyway psychologist, offering his scientific opinion to whoever comes for his guidance.
 Flouncie (voiced by Kathleen Barr) - A large dog with a self-image problem and wants a playmate, seeing herself to be dainty despite being strong enough to unknowingly kill any unfortunate animal she befriends.
 Gasper (voiced by Scott McNeil) - Tiny Head's pet goldfish and victim of his friend's unintentionally harmful tokens of kindness.
 Jack (voiced by Bill Kopp) - An intellectual terrier with glasses, taking them off while in the presence of his owner.
 Broken Bear (voiced by Colin Murdock) - A bear whose tagging by wildlife authorities placed him under the delusion that he was abducted by aliens. As a result, Broken Bear expects the aliens to return so he can be taken again and serve them as their leader.

Series overview

Episodes

International broadcast 
United States
Animal Planet (2010)
The Hub (2010-2014)
United Kingdom
CBBC
Only run: 2009-2010 
Finland
MTV Juniori
India
Hungama TV
Sony Yay
Indonesia
Global TV
Netherlands
Z@PP
NPO 1
NPO 2
NPO 3
Belgium
Ketnet
Nickelodeon
Disney XD
Latin America
Cartoon Network
First run: 2011-2012
Second run: 2013
Third and final run: 2014
Boomerang
Only run: 2014-2016 
Canada
Middle East and North Africa 
Jeem TV
Jcctv (Al Jazeera Children's Channel)
United Arab Emirates
e-Junior
Japan
Disney Channel
Australia
ABC Me

References

External links
Official site at American Greetings

2010 American television series debuts
2010 American television series endings
2010s American animated television series
2010s Canadian animated television series
2010 Canadian television series debuts
2010 Canadian television series endings
2010s French animated television series
2010 French television series debuts
2010 French television series endings
American children's animated comedy television series
American computer-animated television series
Canadian children's animated comedy television series
Canadian computer-animated television series
French children's animated comedy television series
French computer-animated television series
Animated television series about bears
Animated television series about birds
Animated television series about cats
Animated television series about dogs
Animated television series about fish
Animated television series about mice and rats
Animated television series about squirrels
Television series by Splash Entertainment
Discovery Family original programming
English-language television shows